The Hansa-Brandenburg B.I was an unarmed military trainer and reconnaissance biplane of World War I, flown by the Austro-Hungarian Air Service. Early models were known internally to the Hansa-Brandenburg firm as the type D, while later models with a more powerful engine were designated FD. This aircraft was one of the earliest designs of Ernst Heinkel, who was working for Hansa-Brandenburg at the time. It was an entirely conventional two-bay biplane with staggered wings of unequal span. The pilot and observer sat in tandem in a long open cockpit.

The aircraft was produced under license by Aero, both during the war and afterwards (when it became known as the Aero Ae 01), and also by Letov, as the Š10. Experience gained with this design would provide Aero with the basis for a number of derivative civil and military designs throughout the 1920s.

The design formed the basis for the C.I and C.II armed reconnaissance types.

Variants
both variants shared the military designation B.I
 D - initial version with Benz Bz.II engine
 FD - later version with Benz Bz.III engine

Operators

Austro-Hungarian Imperial and Royal Aviation Troops
Austro-Hungarian Navy

Polish Air Force (postwar, 15 aircraft)

Czechoslovak Air Force (postwar)

Royal Hungarian Air Force

Yugoslav Royal Air Force (postwar)
Letalski center Maribor (postwar)

Survivors
Only a single Hansa-Brandenburg B.I  has survived World War One, it is located in the Budapest Aviation Museum in Hungary.

Specifications (FD)

See also

References

External links

 Hansa Brandenburg B.I Details Photos at the Budapest Museum of Aviation

1910s German military reconnaissance aircraft
B.I
Biplanes
Single-engined tractor aircraft
Aircraft first flown in 1914